A Blitz of Salt-N-Pepa Hits: The Hits Remixed is the first compilation album by American hip hop trio Salt-N-Pepa. It includes re-mixed versions of songs taken from their three studio albums, Hot, Cool & Vicious, A Salt with a Deadly Pepa and Blacks' Magic. The album has been certified platinum in Canada.

Review
Stephen Thomas Erlewine of AllMusic wrote: "As remix albums go, Salt-N-Pepa's is fine, but their hit singles lose a bit of their magic in these extended forms."

Track listing

Credits
 Mastered at The Hit Factory
 Mastered by Herb Powers Jr.

Charts

Certifications

References

1990 remix albums
Salt-N-Pepa albums